Beltrami is a neighborhood in the Northeast community in Minneapolis. Its boundaries are Broadway Street NE to the north, Interstate 35W to the east, East Hennepin Avenue to the south, and Central Avenue and Harrison Street NE to the west.
 Beltrami neighborhood and park are named after Giacomo Constantino Beltrami, an early 19th-century Italian jurist, scholar and explorer.

Beltrami covers an area of 0.267 square miles, and has a population of approximately 1,312.

The Beltrami Neighborhood keeps a current list of activities on a blog found at http://discoverbeltrami.org/.

Demographics 
Beltrami's ethnic makeup has changed since 1980. Every ethnic group except whites saw an increase in population between 1980 and 2000. White residents, who made up 92 percent of the neighborhood population in 1980, made up 61 percent in 2000. While there were 141 fewer white residents in 2000 than in 1980, there were 143 more black residents. The black population increased from a fraction of a percent in 1980 to 11 percent in 2000. The percentages for Hispanic and Asian populations also grew during this time, from 2 percent and 1 percent respectively to 10 percent each. In 1999, 24 percent of Beltrami residents lived below the poverty level, compared to 17 percent of Minneapolis residents.

References

External links

Minneapolis Neighborhood Profile - Beltrami

Neighborhoods in Minneapolis